The Week is an Indian news magazine founded in the year 1982 and published by The Malayala Manorama Co. Pvt. Ltd. The magazine is published from Kochi and is currently printed in Delhi, Mumbai, Bengaluru and Kottayam. According to the Audit Bureau of Circulations, it is the largest circulated English news magazine in India.

The magazine covers politics, entertainment, social issues, trends, technology and lifestyle.

History

Chief editors 
The Week was launched by The Malayala Manorama Co. Ltd in December, 1982, and has had two chief editors, before the designation was discontinued.
 K. M. Mathew (Padma Bhushan, 1998), the founder chief editor, remained in office until 25 December 1988. Popularly known as Mathukuttychayan, he was chairman of the Press Trust of India, president of the Indian Newspaper Society and chairman of the Audit Bureau of Circulations. He died on 1 August 2010. The obit which appeared in The Times of India said, "The highly acclaimed English news magazine-The Week-was his brainchild."
 K. M. Mathew's eldest son, Mammen Mathew, (Padma Shri, 2005), took over on 1 January 1989, and continued until 9 December 2007. He is currently chief editor of the Malayala Manorama daily, the group's flagship publication.
Currently, The Week does not have a chief editor. K. M. Mathew's second son, Philip Mathew, managing editor since 1 January 1989, is the highest-ranked editor.

Publishers 
 Philip Mathew, the first publisher of the magazine, held the post until December 1988.
 Jacob Mathew: 1 January 1989 till date. K.M. Mathew's third son, he is currently president of WAN-IFRA. He is the second Asian and the first Indian to hold the post.

Editors 
The magazine has had two editors, after which the designation was discontinued.
 V. K. B. Nair: 26 December 1982 to 3 June 1984.
 T. V. R. Shenoy (Padma Bhushan, 2003): 10 June 1984 to 11 December 1988.

Editor-in-charge 
Currently, the editor-in-charge is responsible for selection of news under The Press and Registration of Books Act, 1867. The present editor-in-charge, V.S. Jayaschandran, took over on 1 April 2017.

Design and style 
The magazine was initially designed in-house, and was periodically redesigned. A major content overhaul was led by Peter Lim, author and former editor-in-chief of The Straits Times/Singapore Press Holdings. He authored the book Chronicle of Singapore: Fifty Years of Headline News.

The two major redesigns were led by:
 Peter Ong on 8 November 1998.
 Dr Mario Garcia on 20 February 2005.

Based in Sydney, Australia, Ong was formerly Picture & Graphics Editor of The Straits Times. He is principal consultant at Checkout Australia, and was regional director for the Society of News Design. Garcia owns the premier newspaper design firm, Garcia Media. Both of them also helped redesign the Malayala Manorama.

In the early years, cartoonist Mario Miranda designed many covers for The Week. He also had a regular pocket cartoon in the magazine.

The Week does not have published stylebook, but generally follows the down style for capitalisation. Its dateline carries the pull date, not the date of issue.

Columnists 
The Week has these regular guest columns:
 Ivory Tour by Sanjaya Baru
 DeTour by Shobhaa De
 Forthwrite by Meenakshi Lekhi.
 Bitter Chocolate by Swara Bhasker
Mani-festo by Mani Shankar Aiyar
 Last Word by Shashi Tharoor, Barkha Dutt, Navtej Sarna and Bibek Debroy
 Schizo-Nation by Anuja Chauhan.
 Sound Bite by Anita Pratap.

In addition to the guests, there are two staff columns.
 Power Point by K. S. Sachidananda Murthy, resident editor in New Delhi.
 PMO Beat by R. Prasannan, chief of bureau, New Delhi.

Former columnists 
Former columnists of the magazine include Priyanka Chopra, Khushwant Singh, Saurav Ganguly, General Bikram Singh (retd), P. C. Alexander, Binayak Sen, Sania Mirza, Saina Nehwal, Sanjay Manjrekar, R. N. Malhotra, Sanjana Kapoor, A. P. Venkateswaran, Harsha Bhogle, Sreenivasan Jain, Mallika Sarabhai, Nandita Das, Manjula Padmanabhan, Amjad Ali Khan, Santosh Desai and Antara Dev Sen, among others.

Supplements and stand-alones 
Two supplements go free with The Week:
 Health, a fortnightly on health and fitness.
 The Wallet, a monthly guide to personal finance and investment.

The standalone magazines are:
 The Man: The Man, a monthly lifestyle magazine for men
 WatchTime India: A quarterly magazine on luxury watches
 Smartlife: A monthly magazine on wellness and lifestyle
 Livingetc: A monthly magazine on home and interiors

The Week Hay Festival

Hay Kerala 2010 
The Week was the title sponsor, of the inaugural Hay Festival in India. Held in Thiruvananthapuram, Kerala, from 12 to 14 November 2010, the festival was held at Kanakakunnu Palace, the former summer retreat of the Travancore royal family.

Writers and speakers for the event included Mani Shankar Aiyar, Rosie Boycott, Gillian Clarke, William Dalrymple, Tishani Doshi, Sonia Faleiro, Sebastian Faulks, Nik Gowing, Manu Joseph, N. S. Madhavan, Jaishree Misra, Vivek Narayanan, Michelle Paver, Basharat Peer, Hannah Rothschild, K. Satchidanandan, Marcus du Sautoy, Simon Schama, Vikram Seth, C. P. Surendran, Miguel Syjuco, Shashi Tharoor, Amrita Tripathi, Pavan Varma and Paul Zacharia.

The event closed with a concert by Bob Geldof, where Sting made a surprise appearance.

Awards 

In 2001, Special Cover Designer Ajay Pingle entered the Limca Book of Records for designing the most number of covers for an Indian newsmagazine.

Man of the Year 
 2009 – Brother Christudas, for Little Flower Leprosy Welfare Association
 2010 – Satinath Sarangi, for voicing Bhopal disaster victims
 2011 – Ajeet Singh, for Guria
 2018 – Nilesh Desai, Lighting up the Darkness
2019 – Madhav Gadgil, for his work in ecology
2020 – Sonu Sood, for his humanitarian efforts during the pandemic
2021 – Balram Bhargava, ICMR Director-General

Couple of the Year 
 2017 – Ramesh Awasthi and Manisha Gupte

Controversies 
The magazine was mired in controversy for an article on Vinayak Damodar Savarkar. In response to a defamation suit filed by Ranjit Savarkar, the magazine publicly apologized for the publication of the article.

References

External links 

 

1982 establishments in Kerala
News magazines published in India
Weekly magazines published in India
English-language magazines published in India
Magazines established in 1982
Malayala Manorama group